Phil Hester (born 1966) is an American comic book artist, penciller and writer.

Early life
Phil Hester is an alumnus of the University of Iowa. He is originally from North English, Iowa.

Career
Hester's pencilling credits include Swamp Thing, Brave New World, Flinch, Ultimate Marvel Team-Up, Clerks: The Lost Scene, The Crow: Waking Nightmares, The Wretch (nominated for the 1997 Eisner Award for Best New Series), Aliens: Purge, and Green Arrow.

During his run on Green Arrow, he created the characters Mia Dearden and Onomatopoeia with writer Kevin Smith as well as Constantine Drakon with writer Judd Winick.

Hester co-created Uncle Slam and Firedog with his Green Arrow collaborator, artist Ande Parks. He also created El Diablo, a new character (with a common name in DC Comics) who debuted in an eponymous limited series. His last comic 13 Steps will adapted in a Comedy Horror film.

Hester is currently writing the new adventures of Golden Age hero The Black Terror for Dynamite Entertainment, based on plot ideas by Alex Ross, as part of the Project Superpowers Universe.

He also wrote DC's Wonder Woman, based on the notes and outline by J. Michael Straczynski, after Straczynski left the title.

In December 2020 he was announced as the new artist on Superman, alongside writer Phillip Kennedy Johnson.

Known for his extensive collection of original comic art, he is the originator of the Hester Paradox. Wherein the a collection is so large that it is prohibitively expensive to insure and yet is too valuable not to insure.

Bibliography
 Ant-Man
 Clerks: The Lost Scene
 Deep Sleeper
 Nightwing
 El Diablo (pencils, with writer Jai Nitz and inks by Ande Parks, 6-issue limited series, September 2008)
 Four Letter Worlds
 Godzilla: Kingdom of Monsters #1–4 
 Green Arrow
 Firebreather
 Mythic
 Nails
 Namor
 Oversight (anthology of many previously published short pieces)
 Rust vol.3
 S.T.A.T" (Security Through Acquired Talents)
 Stronghold Swamp Thing Teddy and the yeti The Anchor Issues 1–8
 The Atheist The Coffin The Creeper The Darkness: Accursed The Holy Terror The Wretch Timecop (comics) Ultimate Marvel Team-Up #2–3
 Uncle Slam and Firedog Wonder Woman'' #605–614

Notes

References
Phil Hester at Marvel.com

External links

 
 
 Creator page at Action Planet

Interviews
 Phil Hester: Straight Shooter – interview at Silver Bullet Comic Books
 Interview with Futureal Studio
 Interview with The Outhouse
 Interview at Comicbloc.com
 Interview: Phil Hester On His Unorthodox Journey Into Comics

American comics artists
American comics writers
People from Iowa
1966 births
Living people
University of Iowa alumni